Towelhead (alternatively titled Nothing Is Private) is a 2007 American drama film written and directed by Alan Ball and based on Alicia Erian's novel of the same name. The film made its world premiere at the Toronto International Film Festival on September 8, 2007 under the name Nothing Is Private. The film, like the book, touches on issues of  coming-of-age, sexual awakening, privacy, and race.

Plot
In 1990 amid the Kuwait War of 1990–1991, 13-year-old Jasira, a Lebanese-American girl, lives with her mother in Syracuse, New York. When her mother's live-in boyfriend helps Jasira shave her pubic hair, her mother sends Jasira to live with her old-fashioned and domineering Lebanese father Rifat in suburban Houston, Texas. Jasira is treated as a second class citizen by her overprotective father. He is strict, does not allow her to use tampons, and prefers spending time with his new girlfriend Thena. Even her mother refuses to support her when she calls and begs for help, forcing Jasira to comply with his rules. Her father acts very disrespectfully towards her and berates her for the slightest thing.

Jasira experiences a sexual awakening, sparked in part by adult magazines she finds when baby-sitting her next-door neighbor Zack Vuoso. While Jasira is home alone one night, Zack's father Travis comes over to retrieve one of his magazines and sexually assaults her. Jasira befriends a classmate, Thomas Bradley, eventually becoming sexually active with him. When Rifat finds out about her relationship with Thomas, he forbids her from ever seeing him, only because he is black.

Mr. Vuoso becomes jealous of Jasira's relationship with Thomas, and, pretending he has to go to Iraq the next morning, tricks Jasira into sleeping with him. When Rifat finds one of Mr. Vuoso's adult magazines at his house, he beats Jasira, and she seeks refuge at the home of pregnant Melina and her husband, Gil, neighbors who were aware of and concerned about Mr. Vuoso's inappropriate behavior towards Jasira from the beginning. While staying at their house, Gil notices bruises on Jasira's legs and Rifat angrily knocks on the door wanting to retrieve his daughter. When both Melina and Gil refuse to let Rifat in, he threatens to call the police and claim that they kidnapped his daughter, but Gil responds to Rifat that he will tell them about the bruises he left on Jasira. She goes to school the next day and Melina picks her up, along with Thomas. When they make it back home, they decide to have sex, but are almost caught by Melina.

Later, Rifat visits the couple along with Thena. He notices Thomas is in the house and angrily confronts him. He also reveals why he despises him. He then decides to check the house and discovers a condom in the trash. He assumes Thomas is responsible for taking his daughter's virginity and attempts to assault him. This forces Jasira to confess that she had sex with Mr. Vuoso, who is then arrested and bailed out the next day.

Thomas talks with Jasira about her abuse from Mr. Vuoso, and explains that he does not want to have sex with her anymore. She says she does not want to stop. One day after school, Jasira retrieves the corpse of Travis' cat, which ran off after she came by his house and was accidentally run over by Rifat on his way home. When Melina sees Jasira talking to Mr. Vuoso, she runs outside to stop the conversation, but trips and falls down on the ground, which causes her to bleed and go into labor. While at the hospital, Rifat is asked by Jasira to accompany Melina in the delivery room, since her husband will not make it in time. When Rifat refuses to stay, he finally decides to trust Jasira and let her stay and live with Melina, which makes her very happy. He leaves the delivery room and Jasira witnesses Melina giving birth to a baby girl.

Cast

Critical reception
Towelhead received mixed reviews from critics; Rotten Tomatoes reports that 49% of critics have given the film a positive review based on 114 reviews, with an average rating of 5.36/10. The consensus reads, "This story of politics, race and sexual awakening has moments that pack a punch, but overall, Towelhead never quite achieves the nuance of helmer Alan Ball's television work." The film also holds a score of 57 out of 100 on Metacritic based on 31 reviews.

References

External links
 
 
 
 
 

2007 films
2007 directorial debut films
2007 drama films
2007 independent films
2000s coming-of-age drama films
2000s English-language films
American black comedy films
American coming-of-age drama films
American independent films
Films about child sexual abuse
Films about dysfunctional families
Films about interracial romance
Films about rape
Films based on American novels
Films scored by Thomas Newman
Films set in 1990
Films set in Houston
Films set in New York (state)
Films shot in Los Angeles
Indian Paintbrush (production company) films
Lebanese-American culture
Warner Independent Pictures films
Juvenile sexuality in films
Films about puberty
Films about father–daughter relationships
2000s American films